Chronoxenus wroughtonii is a species of ant of the genus Chronoxenus. It was described by Forel in 1895, and was once apart of the genus Iridomyrmex. They are endemic to China, India and South Korea.

Subspecies
Chronoxenus wroughtonii has three subspecies:

 Chronoxenus wroughtonii formosensis (Forel, 1913)
 Chronoxenus wroughtonii javanus (Forel, 1909)
 Chronoxenus wroughtonii victoriae (Forel, 1895)

References

Dolichoderinae
Insects of China
Insects of India
Insects of Korea
Insects described in 1895